= Søren Balling Engelsen =

Danish chemist

Søren Balling Engelsen, Ph.D. (1992), is a Danish chemist, who is active in the fields of analytical chemistry and food science; he is a professor of the University of Copenhagen (UCPH) since 2004.

== Literature ==
- Peter Gedeck, Christian Kramer, Peter Ertl: Computational Analysis of Structure–Activity Relationships // Progress in Medicinal Chemistry, Volume 49, 2010, Pages 113–160; doi:10.1016/S0079-6468(10)49004-9.

== Web-sources ==
- "Søren Balling Engelsen: Professor, Chemometrics and Analytical Technology". Department of Food Science, University of Copenhagen. 2007-08-08.
